Ball Boys is an American reality television series that aired on ABC. The series premiered on March 24, 2012.

Premise
The series is filmed in Lutherville, Maryland, where it chronicles the activities at Robbie's First Base, a family business operated by Robbie Davis, Sr. ("Senior") and his son, Robbie Davis, Jr. ("Junior"). Assisting them is Robbie Reier ("Shaggy"), who's very knowledgeable in sports history; and Lewis "Sweet Lou" Brown, a longtime employee who's not too bright. The show features various sports memorabilia experts from around the United States who make appearances on the show to let the guys at the shop know whether the items they are being offered are real or fake and what the actual value of these historic treasures are worth.  Noted experts such as Richard Albersheim of Albersheim's (Las Vegas, NV) and Troy Kinunen of MEARS (Milwaukee, WI) are amongst the noted experts who help them out.

Episodes

References

External links
 
 Robbie's First Base

2010s American reality television series
2012 American television series debuts
2012 American television series endings
American sports television series
American Broadcasting Company original programming
Television shows set in Baltimore